Carlos Vicente (born 18 November 1971) is a Spanish cross-country skier. He competed at the 1992 Winter Olympics and the 1994 Winter Olympics.

References

1971 births
Living people
Spanish male cross-country skiers
Olympic cross-country skiers of Spain
Cross-country skiers at the 1992 Winter Olympics
Cross-country skiers at the 1994 Winter Olympics
Place of birth missing (living people)